Rumana Khan is a  Bangladeshi film and television actress. She won Bangladesh National Film Award for Best Supporting Actress for her role in the film Bhalobaslei Ghor Bandha Jay Na (2010).

Personal life
Khan was first married to filmmaker Anzam Masud in 2001. After their divorce in 2003, she married businessman, Sazzad, in 2004. She married her third husband, Alin Rahman, in 2015.

References

External links

Living people
Bangladeshi film actresses
Bangladeshi television actresses
Year of birth missing (living people)
Place of birth missing (living people)
Best Supporting Actress National Film Award (Bangladesh) winners